Gornji Zovik may refer to:

 Gornji Zovik (Brčko), a village in Bosnia and Herzegovina
 Gornji Zovik (Hadžići), a village in Bosnia and Herzegovina